Carolinus (or Karolinus) is an instructional poem written by 12th century poet Gilles de Paris for future King Louis VIII of France around the year 1200.

External links
Lett, Didier & Christiane Klapisch-Zuber, "L'Ombre des ancêtres. Essai sur l'imaginaire médiéval de la parenté"; in: Médiévales; 2001; vol. 20, tome 41, 176-180

12th-century poems
French poems